Sharpsburg is an unincorporated community in Mercer County, in the U.S. state of Ohio.

History
The post office at Sharpsburg was called Violet. This post office was established in 1886, and remained in operation until 1904.

References

Unincorporated communities in Mercer County, Ohio
Unincorporated communities in Ohio